Quercus devia is a species of oak tree in the family Fagaceae, native to northwestern Mexico. The tree is endemic to the Sierra de la Laguna range of the Peninsular Ranges system, located in the southern part of the Baja California Sur state of Mexico. It grows in Sierra de la Laguna pine-oak forests habitats. It is an IUCN Red List endangered species, threatened by habitat loss. It is placed in section Lobatae.

References

Further reading
 Oaks of the World: Quercus devia

devia
Flora of Northwestern Mexico
Endemic oaks of Mexico
Trees of Baja California Sur
Natural history of the Peninsular Ranges
Taxonomy articles created by Polbot